Kemar Ronex Garland Scott (born 17 November 1987) is a Caymanian footballer who plays as a midfielder. He has represented the Cayman Islands during a World Cup qualifying match in 2011.

References

Association football midfielders
Living people
1987 births
Caymanian footballers
Cayman Islands international footballers
Cayman Athletic SC players